The Camp Hills are a small group of hills which lie between the southern portion of the Bastien Range and the Minnesota Glacier, in the Ellsworth Mountains. They were so named by the University of Minnesota Geological Party, 1963–64, because they established their base camp (Camp Gould) near these hills.

References
 

Hills of Ellsworth Land